The St. Nicholas Cathedral  also called Ruski Krstur Cathedral is a Catholic cathedral in the town of Ruski Krstur, in the city of Kula, in the European country of Serbia.

The church follows the Byzantine rite and serves as the cathedral of the Greek Catholic Eparchy of Ruski Krstur, previously the Exarchatus Apostolicus Serbiae (Гркокатолички апостолски егзархат у Србији). The church was elevated in cathedral on August 28, 2003, simultaneously with the creation of the Apostolic Exarchate for Catholics of Byzantine rite of Serbia under the pontificate of Pope John Paul II.

The present building was built in 1784 but underwent a reconstruction in 1836, as evidenced by the inscription on the north portal. Between 1961 and 1963 there was the complete restoration of the iconostasis. Some restoration works were carried out in 1972.

See also
Roman Catholicism in Serbia

References

Eastern Catholic cathedrals in Serbia
Ruski Krstur
Roman Catholic churches completed in 1784
Cultural Monuments of Great Importance (Serbia)
18th-century Roman Catholic church buildings in Serbia